Xavier Bastard (born 25 August 1984) is a French Muay thai kickboxer. He is the former WPMF World and Intercontinental Lightweight champion.

Muay Thai career
After failing to beat Apisit Koedchatturat for the WPMF World Lightweight title, he fought once more for it against Rob Storey in January 2012. Bastard won the fight by unanimous decision. It was the second major title in his career, after winning the WPMF Intercontinental Lightweight title in the previous year.

He participated in the Krush 29 tournament, with the ISKA World Lightweight title being the tournament prize. He defeated Naoki Ishikawa by TKO, but lost to Koya Urabe by TKO in the finals.

He returned from a three-year absence from the sport in June 2018, to fight Khunsuknoi Sitkaewprapon. Khunsuknoi won the fight by unanimous decision. Four months later he fought Celestin Mendes, but once again lost by unanimous decision.

Bastard fought Soare Marian Florin in January 2020, during Ultimate Fight Night. He won the fight by decision, snapping a five fight losing streak.

Championships and accomplishments
 2012 WPMF World Lightweight Champion
 2011 WPMF Intercontinental Lightweight champion

Fight record

|-  bgcolor="#cfc"
| 2022-4-22||Win ||align=left| Samuel Iorio   || Ultimate Fight Night 9 || Brest, France || Decision || 3 || 3:00
|-  bgcolor="#cfc"
| 2020-1-17||Win ||align=left| Marian-Florin Soare  || Ultimate Fight Night || Brest, France || Decision (Unanimous) || 3 || 3:00
|-  bgcolor="#fbb"
| 2018-10-6|| Loss ||align=left| Celestin Mendes || Challenge || Saint-Amand-les-Eaux, France || Decision (Unanimous) || 3 || 3:00
|-  bgcolor="#fbb"
| 2018-6-16|| Loss ||align=left| Khunsuknoi Sitkaewprapon || Best Of Bretagne || Brest, France || Decision (Unanimous) || 3 || 3:00
|-  bgcolor="#fbb"
| 2015-5-23|| Loss ||align=left| Arthur Meyer || Radikal Fight Night 3 || Charleville-Mézières, France || Decision (Unanimous) || 3 || 3:00
|-  bgcolor="#fbb"
| 2015-4-11 || Loss ||align=left| Giuseppe Lavecchia || La Nuit du Fight || Vannes, France || KO || 5 ||
|-  bgcolor="#fbb"
| 2014-12-4 || Loss ||align=left| || King's Birthday || Pattaya, Thailand || TKO || 2 ||
|-  bgcolor="#c5d2ea"
| 2014-11-22 || Draw ||align=left| Ayoub El Khaidar || Défi Boxe Thai || Morlaix, France || Decision (Unanimous) || 3 || 3:00
|-  bgcolor="#c5d2ea"
| 2014-5-1 || Draw ||align=left| Hirotaka Urabe || Best of Fight || Guéret, France || Decision (Unanimous) || 5 || 3:00
|-
! style=background:white colspan=9 |
|-  bgcolor="#cfc"
| 2014-4-5 || Win ||align=left| Luca Gigliotti || Oktagon || Assago, Italy || Decision (Unanimous) || 3 || 3:00
|-  bgcolor="#fbb"
| 2013-11-23 || Loss ||align=left| Thomas Adamandopoulos || Nuit des Champions 2013 || Marseille, France || Decision (Unanimous) || 3 || 3:00
|-  bgcolor="#fbb"
| 2013-6-16 || Loss ||align=left| Koya Urabe || Krush 29, Tournament Final || Bunkyo, Japan || TKO || 2 ||
|-
! style=background:white colspan=9 |
|-  bgcolor="#cfc"
| 2013-6-16 || Win ||align=left| Naoki Ishikawa || Krush 29, Tournament Semifinal || Bunkyo, Japan || TKO || 3 ||
|-  bgcolor="#cfc"
| 2013-5-25 || Win ||align=left| Gabriel Moreno || Final Fight || Bagnols-sur-Cèze, France || TKO || 2 ||
|-  bgcolor="#cfc"
| 2013-4-20 || Win ||align=left| Arnaud Charrier || Trophées de l'Iroise || Locmaria-Plouzané, France || ||  ||
|-  bgcolor="#c5d2ea"
| 2013-3-9 || Draw ||align=left| Umar Paskhaev || Nuit Des Champions 10 || Dinard, France || Decision (Unanimous) || 3 || 3:00
|-  bgcolor="#cfc"
| 2013-1-12 || Win ||align=left| Daniel Saporito || La Nuit du Fight || Vannes, France || Decision (Unanimous) || 3 || 3:00
|-  bgcolor="#fbb"
| 2012-10-8 || Loss ||align=left| Hirotaka Urabe || Krush 23 || Bunkyo, Japan || TKO || 4 ||
|-  bgcolor="#cfc"
| 2012-5-19 || Win ||align=left| Bartosz Batra || Gala Muay Thai – Polska vs Francja || Pruszków, Poland || Decision (Unanimous) || 3 || 3:00
|-  bgcolor="#cfc"
| 2012-4-14 || Win ||align=left| Adrien Gref || Gala De Saumur || France || Decision (Unanimous) || 3 || 3:00
|-  bgcolor="#cfc"
| 2012-1-21 || Win ||align=left| Rob Storey || Championnat Du Monde WPMF – Championnat d'Europe WPMF || Vannes, France || Decision (Unanimous) || 5 || 3:00
|-
! style=background:white colspan=9 |
|-  bgcolor="#fbb"
| 2011-5-14 || Loss ||align=left| Apisit Koedchatturat || Le defi des jardins de Brocéliande || Montfort-sur-Meu, France || Decision (Unanimous) || 5 || 3:00
|-
! style=background:white colspan=9 |
|-  bgcolor="#cfc"
| 2011-4-2 || Win ||align=left| David McIntosh || Explosion Fight Night Vol.3 || Brest, France || Decision (Unanimous) || 5 || 3:00
|-
! style=background:white colspan=9 |
|-  bgcolor="#cfc"
| 2011-3-12 || Win ||align=left| Sofiane Bougossa || 8ème Nuit Des Champions || Dinard, France || Decision (Unanimous) || 3 || 3:00
|-  bgcolor="#fbb"
| 2009-2-7 || Loss ||align=left| Albert Veera Chey || Gala de Boxe Thai de Saumur || Saumur, France || TKO (Referee Stoppage) || 5 ||
|-
| colspan=9 | Legend:

See also
 List of male kickboxers

References

Living people
1984 births
French Muay Thai practitioners
Sportspeople from Vannes
Bantamweight kickboxers